Aethammobates is a monotypic genus of bees belonging to the family Apidae. The only species is Aethammobates prionogaster.

The species is found in Egypt.

References

Apidae
Monotypic Hymenoptera genera